The Victoria Hall is a concert hall in Geneva, Switzerland.

History
The Victoria Hall was built in 1891–1894 by the architect John Camoletti and financed by the British consul, Daniel Fitzgerald Packenham Barton, who dedicated it to Queen Victoria and gifted it to the City of Geneva in 1904.

On 16 September 1984, the building was partly destroyed by a fire. The decorative paintings by Ernest Biélier were destroyed. It was rebuilt, and the paintings were replaced by a contemporary work by Dominique Appia.

Description
The main entrance is facing east. The auditorium has three layers: The parterre and two layers of balconies. A monumental pipe organ occupies the back of the stage. The original pipe organ was destroyed during the 1984-fire and rebuilt in 1993.

The hall is mainly used for classical music concerts, but it also hosts performers in song, jazz and world music.

References

External links
 Victoria Hall Concert History

Concert halls in Switzerland
Cultural venues in Geneva
Entertainment venues in Geneva
Neoclassical architecture in Switzerland
Music venues completed in 1894
1894 establishments in Switzerland
19th-century architecture in Switzerland